This is an incomplete list of 2018 Women's March events - rallies, marches, community activities, and voter registration drives - that took place in cities, towns and villages on January 20 and January 21, 2018 (the latter as noted).  By January 21, there were around 250 site-specific events reported.

United States 

Listed below are over 380 marches in the U.S. in support of the 2018 Women's March. Larger crowds gathered in cities such as New York, Washington, Los Angeles, Dallas, Philadelphia, Chicago, San Francisco, and Atlanta.  Speakers at the January 20, 2018 rallies called for more women to run for office.

Worldwide 

Listed below are marches outside the United States in support of the 2018 Women's March.

North America 
In Canada there were at least 38 rallies held on January 20.

South America

Europe

Africa

Asia

Oceania

Locations 

The 2018 Women's Marches took place in many cities, towns and villages around the world since January 20, 2018.

References

External links 

 
 YouTube search: - Women's March 2018. Many videos showing the huge crowds at many events worldwide. Uploaded by reliable sources such as mainstream news channels, and other sources.

2018 in American politics
2018 in women's history
2018 protests
History of women's rights
January 2018 events in the United States
Protests against Donald Trump
Women's March
Women's marches
2018 Women's March
Protests in India
January 2018 events in India